Candia Canavese  (in Piedmontese language: Cándia) is a comune of the Metropolitan City of Turin situated in the historical region of the Canavese in Piedmont, Italy  about  northeast of Turin.   It borders the following municipalities: Strambino, Mercenasco, Vische, Barone Canavese, Mazzè, and Caluso.

It is known for the wine Erbaluce di Caluso and for its lake, the Lago di Candia, which is protected as part of the Parco naturale del Lago di Candia nature reserve and also has a rowing club.

Main sights
Various historic buildings found nearby include the eleventh-century church of Santo Stefano al Monte, which probably stands on the ruins of a pagan temple and the late Roman Pieve di San Michele. The 18th century castle was built on the site of the ancient fortress that dominated the town until it was badly damaged in the 14th century, during the wars of the Canavese and finally dismantled by Fabrotino da Parma. Eventually a new castle was erected and it is known today as "Castelfiorito" di Candia Canavese.

Movies filmed here
In Candia Canavese the movies were shot: The house of the damned (original title La villa delle anime maledette (1982) by Carlo Ausino, Il Priorato di Santo Stefano by Andry Verga, Creators: The Past (2017) by Piergiuseppe Zaia. (Info by the Dizionario del Turismo Cinematografico)

References

External links
 Official website
 https://web.archive.org/web/20070930161627/http://www.parchiaccessibili.it/index.cfm?module=Park&Page=ParkShow&List=Surrounding&ParkID=186&DescriptionType=whattodo
 http://www.castelfiorito.com

Cities and towns in Piedmont
Canavese